Daniela Panetta (born 22 October 1968 in Milan) is an Italian jazz vocalist, composer, lyricist and vocalese performer.

Discography

Albums

References

External links 
 

Living people
1968 births
Italian jazz singers
Women jazz singers